Canadian Confederation was the process by which three British North American provinces, the Province of Canada, Nova Scotia, and New Brunswick, were united into one federation called the Dominion of Canada, on July 1, 1867. Upon Confederation, Canada consisted of four provinces: Ontario and Quebec, which had been split out from the Province of Canada, and the provinces of Nova Scotia and New Brunswick. Over the years since Confederation, Canada has seen numerous territorial changes and expansions, resulting in the current number of ten provinces and three territories.

Terminology
Canada is a federation and not a confederate association of sovereign states, which is what "confederation" means in contemporary political theory. It is nevertheless often considered to be among the world's more decentralized federations. The use of the term confederation arose in the Province of Canada to refer to proposals beginning in the 1850s to federate all of the British North American colonies, as opposed to only Canada West (Ontario) and Canada East (Quebec). To contemporaries of Confederation, the con- prefix indicated a strengthening of the centrist principle compared to the American federation.

In this Canadian context, confederation here describes the political process that united the colonies in the 1860s, events related to that process, and the subsequent incorporation of other colonies and territories. The term is now often used to describe Canada in an abstract way, such as in "the Fathers of Confederation". Provinces and territories that became part of Canada after 1867 are also said to have joined, or entered into, confederation (but not the Confederation). The term is also used to divide Canadian history into pre-Confederation (i.e. pre-1867) and post-Confederation (i.e. post-1867) periods.

History

Colonial organization
All the former colonies and territories that became involved in the Canadian Confederation on July 1, 1867, were initially part of New France, and were once ruled by France. Nova Scotia was granted in 1621 to Sir William Alexander under charter by James I. This claim overlapped the French claims to Acadia, and although the Scottish colony of Nova Scotia was short-lived, for political reasons, the conflicting imperial interests of France and the 18th century Great Britain led to a long and bitter struggle for control. The British acquired present-day mainland Nova Scotia by the Treaty of Utrecht of 1713 and the Acadian population was expelled by the British in 1755. They renamed Acadia "Nova Scotia", which included present-day New Brunswick. The rest of New France was acquired by the British as the result of its defeat of New France in the Seven Years' War, which ended with the Treaty of Paris in 1763. From 1763 to 1791, most of New France became the Province of Quebec. However, in 1769 the present-day Prince Edward Island, which had been part of Acadia, was renamed "St John's Island" and organized as a separate colony. It was renamed "Prince Edward Island" in 1798 in honour of Prince Edward, Duke of Kent and Strathearn.

The first English attempt at settlement on that part of the continent that would become modern Canada had been in Newfoundland which would not join Confederation until 1949. The Society of Merchant Venturers of Bristol began to settle Newfoundland and Labrador at Cuper's Cove as far back as 1610, and Newfoundland had also been the subject of a French colonial enterprise.

In the wake of the American Revolution, an estimated 50,000 United Empire Loyalists fled to British North America. The British created the separate province of New Brunswick in 1784 for the Loyalists who settled in the western part of Nova Scotia. While Nova Scotia (including New Brunswick) received slightly more than half of this influx, many Loyalists also settled in the Province of Quebec, which by the Constitutional Act 1791 was separated into a predominantly English Upper Canada and a predominantly French Lower Canada. The War of 1812 and Treaty of 1818 established the 49th parallel as the border with the United States from the Great Lakes to the Rocky Mountains in Western Canada.

Following the Rebellions of 1837, Lord Durham in his Durham Report, recommended Upper and Lower Canada be joined as the Province of Canada and the new province should have a responsible government. As a result of Durham's report, the British Parliament passed the Act of Union 1840, and the Province of Canada was formed in 1841. The new province was divided into two parts: Canada West (the former Upper Canada) and Canada East (the former Lower Canada). Governor General Lord Elgin granted ministerial responsibility in 1848, first to Nova Scotia and then to Canada. In the following years, the British would extend responsible government to Prince Edward Island (1851), New Brunswick (1854), and Newfoundland (1855).

The area which constitutes modern-day British Columbia is the remnants of the Hudson's Bay Company's Columbia District and New Caledonia District following the Oregon Treaty. Before joining Canada in 1871, British Columbia consisted of the separate Colony of British Columbia (formed in 1858, in an area where the Crown had granted a monopoly to the Hudson's Bay Company), and the Colony of Vancouver Island (formed in 1849) constituting a separate crown colony until it was united with the colony of British Columbia in 1866.

The remainder of modern-day Canada was made up of Rupert's Land and the North-Western Territory (both of which were controlled by the Hudson's Bay Company and sold to Canada in 1870) and the Arctic Islands, which were under direct British control and became a part of Canada in 1880.

Early attempts

The idea of unification was presented in 1839 by Lord Durham in his Report on the Affairs of British North America, which resulted in the Act of Union 1840. Beginning in 1857, Joseph-Charles Taché proposed a federation in a series of 33 articles published in the Courrier du Canada.

In 1859, Alexander Tilloch Galt, George-Étienne Cartier and John Ross travelled to Great Britain to present the British Parliament with a project for confederation of the British colonies. The proposal was received by the London authorities with polite indifference. By 1864, it was clear that continued governance of the Province of Canada under the terms of the 1840 Act of Union had become impracticable. Therefore, a Great Coalition of parties formed in order to reform the political system.

Influences leading to Confederation
Several factors influenced Confederation, both caused from internal sources and pressures from external sources.
Internal causes that influenced Confederation
 political deadlock resulting from the current political structure in the Province of Canada
 demographic pressure (population expansion)
 economic nationalism and the promise of economic development
distrust between English Protestants and French Catholics in the Province of Canada 
 lack of an inter-colony railroad which would improve trade, military movement, and transportation in general 

External pressures that influenced Confederation
 cancellation of the Canadian–American Reciprocity Treaty (a free trade policy whereby products were allowed into the United States without taxes or tariffs starting in 1854, which was then considered to be beneficial for Canada), in 1865 by the United States, partly as revenge against Great Britain for unofficial support of the South in the American Civil War
 the U.S. doctrine of "manifest destiny", the possible threat of invasion from the U.S.—Canadians had fended off American invasions during the Revolutionary War and the War of 1812—increased by the Alaska Purchase of March 30, 1867, which was supported on the floor of the U.S. Senate (by Charles Sumner, among others) precisely in terms of taking over the remainder of North America from the British
 the American Civil War, which horrified Canadians and drove many away from any thought of republicanism, along with British actions during the war, and American reactions to Canada
 the Fenian raids
 the Little Englander philosophy, whereby Britain no longer wanted to maintain troops in its colonies.
The St. Albans Raid led to distrust with the United States, increasing the desire for stronger border security which Confederation would bring. 
 political pressure from British financiers who had invested money in the loss-making Grand Trunk Railway
 The Trent Affair

Ideological origins and philosophical dimensions

There is extensive scholarly debate on the role of political ideas in Canadian Confederation. Traditionally, historians regarded Canadian Confederation an exercise in political pragmatism that was essentially non-ideological. In the 1960s, historian Peter Waite derided the references to political philosophers in the legislative debates on Confederation as "hot air". In Waite's view, Confederation was driven by pragmatic brokerage politics and competing interest groups.

In 1987, political scientist Peter J. Smith challenged the view Canadian Confederation was non-ideological. Smith argued Confederation was motivated by new political ideologies as much as the American and French Revolutions and Canadian Confederation was driven by a Court Party ideology. Smith traces the origins of this ideology to eighteenth and nineteenth-century Britain, where political life was polarized between defenders of classical republican values of the Country Party and proponents of a new pro-capitalist ideology of the Court Party, which believed in centralizing political power. In British North America in the late 1860s, the Court Party tradition was represented by the supporters of Confederation, whereas the anti-capitalist and agrarian Country Party tradition was embodied by the Anti-Confederates.

In a 2000 journal article, historian Ian McKay argued Canadian Confederation was motivated by the ideology of liberalism and the belief in the supremacy of individual rights. McKay described Confederation as part of the classical liberal project of creating a "liberal order" in northern North America. Many Canadian historians have adopted McKay's liberal order framework as a paradigm for understanding Canadian history.

In 2008, historian Andrew Smith advanced a very different view of Confederation's ideological origins. He argues that in the four original Canadian provinces, the politics of taxation were a central issue in the debate about Confederation. Taxation was also central to the debate in Newfoundland, the tax-averse colony that rejected it. Smith argued Confederation was supported by many colonists who were sympathetic to a relatively interventionist, or statist, approach to capitalist development. Most classical liberals, who believed in free trade and low taxes, opposed Confederation because they feared it would result in Big Government. The struggle over Confederation involved a battle between a staunch individualist economic philosophy and a comparatively collectivist view of the state's proper role in the economy. According to Smith, the victory of the statist supporters of Confederation over their anti-statist opponents prepared the way for John A. Macdonald's government to enact the protectionist National Policy and to subsidize major infrastructure projects such as the Intercolonial and Pacific Railways.

In 2007, political scientist Janet Ajzenstat connected Canadian Confederation to the individualist ideology of John Locke. She argued that the union of the British North American colonies was motivated by a desire to protect individual rights, especially the rights to life, liberty, and property. She contends the Fathers of Confederation were motivated by the values of the Enlightenment of the seventeenth and eighteenth centuries. She argues their intellectual debts to Locke are most evident when one looks at the 1865 debates in the Province of Canada's legislature on whether or not union with the other British North American colonies would be desirable.

Charlottetown Conference

In the spring of 1864, New Brunswick premier Samuel Leonard Tilley, Nova Scotia premier Charles Tupper, and Prince Edward Island premier John Hamilton Gray were contemplating the idea of a Maritime Union which would join their three colonies together.

The government of the Province of Canada surprised the Maritime governments by asking if the Province of Canada could be included in the negotiations. The request was channelled through the Governor-General, Monck, to London and accepted by the Colonial Office. After several years of legislative paralysis in the Province of Canada caused by the need to maintain a double legislative majority (a majority of both the Canada East and Canada West delegates in the Province of Canada's legislature), Macdonald had led his Liberal-Conservative Party into the Great Coalition with Cartier's Parti bleu and George Brown's Clear Grits. Macdonald, Cartier, and Brown felt union with the other British colonies might be a way to solve the political problems of the Province of Canada.

The Charlottetown Conference began on September 1, 1864. Since the agenda for the meeting had already been set, the delegation from the Province of Canada was initially not an official part of the Conference. The issue of Maritime Union was deferred and the Canadians were formally allowed to join and address the Conference.

No minutes from the Charlottetown Conference survive, but we do know Cartier and Macdonald presented arguments in favour of a union of the three colonies; Alexander Tilloch Galt presented the Province of Canada's proposals on the financial arrangements of such a union; and George Brown presented a proposal for what form a united government might take. The Canadian delegation's proposal for the governmental system involved:
 preservation of ties with Great Britain;
 residual jurisdiction left to a central authority;
 a bicameral system including a Lower House with representation by population (rep by pop) and an Upper House with representation based on regional, rather than provincial, equality;
 responsible government at the federal and provincial levels;
 the appointment of a Canadian governor general by the British Crown.

Other proposals attractive to the politicians from the Maritime colonies were:
 assumption of provincial debt by the central government;
 revenues from the central government apportioned to the provinces on the basis of population;
 the building of an intercolonial railway to link Montreal and Halifax, giving Canada access to an ice-free winter port and the Maritimes easy access to Canada and Rupert's Land.

By September 7, 1864, the delegates from Nova Scotia, New Brunswick and Prince Edward Island gave a positive answer to the Canadian delegation, expressing the view the federation of all of the provinces was considered desirable if the terms of union could be made satisfactory and the question of Maritime Union was waived.

After the Conference adjourned on September 9, there were further meetings between delegates held at Halifax, Saint John, and Fredericton. These meetings evinced enough interest that the delegates decided to hold a second Conference.

Delegates' reactions
One of the most important purposes of the Charlottetown Conference was the introduction of Canadians to the leaders from the Maritime Provinces and vice versa. At this point, there was no railway link from Quebec City to Halifax, and the people of each region had little to do with one another. Thomas D'Arcy McGee was one of the few Canadian delegates who had been to the Maritimes, when he had gone down earlier that summer with a trade mission of Canadian businessmen, journalists and politicians.

George Brown remarked in a letter to his wife Anne that at a party given by the premier of PEI, Colonel John Hamilton Gray, he met a woman who had never been off the island in her entire life. Nevertheless, he found Prince Edward Islanders to be "amazingly civilized".

Press and popular reaction
Reaction to the Charlottetown Conference varied among the different newspapers. In the Maritimes, there was concern that the smooth Canadians with their sparkling champagne and charming speeches were outsmarting the delegates of the smaller provinces. "From all accounts it looks as if these [Canadian] gentlemen had it all their own way; ... and that, what with their arguments and what with their blandishments, (they gave a champagne lunch on board the Victoria where Mr. McGee's wit sparkled brightly as the wine), they carried the Lower Province delegates a little off their feet."

The delegates from the Quebec conference considered if the resolutions would be better suited for acceptance if a popular vote were held on them. However, due to the divide amongst religious groups and general mistrust between areas in Canada, they believed that such a vote would be defeated. Thus, they went ahead with the resolutions on their own volition.

Quebec Conference

After returning home from the Charlottetown Conference, Macdonald asked Viscount Monck, the Governor-General of the Province of Canada to invite delegates from the three Maritime provinces and Newfoundland to a conference with United Canada delegates. At the opening of the conference, a total of 33 delegates were included from the British North American Colonies, including Newfoundland, which had not participated in prior meetings. Monck obliged and the Conference went ahead at Quebec City in October 1864.

The Conference began on October 10, 1864, on the site of present-day Montmorency Park. The Conference elected Étienne-Paschal Taché as its chairman, but it was dominated by Macdonald. Despite differences in the positions of some of the delegates on some issues, the Quebec Conference, following so swiftly on the success of the Charlottetown Conference, was infused with a determinative sense of purpose and nationalism. For the Reformers of Canada West, led by George Brown, the end of what they perceived as French-Canadian interference in local affairs was in sight. For Maritimers such as Tupper of Nova Scotia or Tilley of New Brunswick, horizons were suddenly broadened to take in much larger possibilities for trade and growth.

On the issue of the Senate, the Maritime Provinces pressed for as much equality as possible. With the addition of Newfoundland to the Conference, the other three Maritime colonies did not wish to see the strength of their provinces in the upper chamber diluted by simply adding Newfoundland to the Atlantic category. It was the matter of the Senate that threatened to derail the entire proceedings. It was Macdonald who came up with the acceptable compromise of giving Newfoundland four senators of its own when it joined.

The delegates from the Maritimes also raised an issue with respect to the level of government—federal or provincial—that would be given the powers not otherwise specifically defined. Macdonald, who was aiming for the strongest central government possible, insisted this was to be the central government, and in this, he was supported by, among others, Tupper.

At the end of the Conference, it adopted the Seventy-two Resolutions which would form the basis of a scheduled future conference. The Conference adjourned on October 27.

Prince Edward Island emerged disappointed from the Quebec Conference. It did not receive support for a guarantee of six members in the proposed House of Commons, and was denied an appropriation of $200,000 it felt had been offered at Charlottetown to assist in buying out the holdings of absentee landlords.

Press and popular reaction
"Never was there such an opportunity as now for the birth of a nation" proclaimed a pamphlet written by S. E. Dawson and reprinted in a Quebec City newspaper during the Conference.

Again, reaction to the Quebec Conference varied depending on the political views of the critic.

Constitutional scheme discussed in London
George Brown was the first to carry the constitutional proposals to the British Government in London in December 1864, where it gave "a most gracious answer to our constitutional scheme." He also met with William Gladstone, who was then chancellor of the Exchequer and later prime minister, "who agreed in almost everything." In April 1865, Brown, Macdonald, Cartier and Galt met with the Imperial Government where "The project of a federal union of the colonies was highly approved of by the Imperial authorities."

London Conference

Following the Quebec Conference, the Province of Canada's legislature passed a bill approving the union. The union proved more controversial in the Maritime provinces, however, and it was not until 1866 that New Brunswick and Nova Scotia passed union resolutions, while Prince Edward Island and Newfoundland continued to opt against joining.

In December 1866, sixteen delegates from the Province of Canada, New Brunswick, and Nova Scotia travelled to London, where the 4th Earl of Carnarvon presented each to Queen Victoria in private audience, as well as holding court for their wives and daughters. At meetings held at the Westminster Palace Hotel, the delegates reviewed and approved the 72 resolutions; although Charles Tupper had promised anti-union forces in Nova Scotia he would push for amendments, he was unsuccessful in getting any passed. Now known as the London Resolutions, the conference's decisions were forwarded to the Colonial Office.

After breaking for Christmas, the delegates reconvened in January 1867 and began drafting the British North America Act. The 4th Earl of Carnarvon continued to have a central role in drafting the act at Highclere Castle alongside the first prime minister of Canada Macdonald, Cartier and Galt, who signed the visitor book in 1866. After suggestions of 'Franklin' and 'Guelfenland', they agreed the new country should be called Canada, Canada East should be renamed Quebec and Canada West should be renamed Ontario. There was, however, heated debate about how the new country should be designated. Ultimately, the delegates elected to call the new country the Dominion of Canada, after "kingdom" and "confederation", among other options, were rejected. The term dominion was allegedly suggested by Sir Samuel Leonard Tilley.

The delegates had completed their draft of the British North America Act by February 1867. The act was presented to Queen Victoria on February 11, 1867. The bill was introduced in the House of Lords the next day. The bill was quickly approved by the House of Lords, and then also quickly approved by the British House of Commons. (The Conservative Lord Derby was prime minister of the United Kingdom at the time.) The act received royal assent on March 29, 1867, and set July 1, 1867, as the date for union.

British North America Acts

Confederation was accomplished when the Queen gave royal assent to the British North America Act (BNA Act) on March 29, 1867, followed by a royal proclamation stating: "We do ordain, declare, and command that on and after the First day of July, One Thousand Eight Hundred and Sixty-seven, the Provinces of Canada, Nova Scotia, and New Brunswick, shall form and be One Dominion, under the name of Canada." That act, which united the Province of Canada with the colonies of New Brunswick and Nova Scotia, came into effect on July 1 that year. The act replaced the Act of Union 1840 which had unified Upper Canada and Lower Canada into the united Province of Canada. Separate provinces were re-established under their current names of Ontario and Quebec. July 1 is now celebrated as a public holiday, Canada Day, the country's official National Day.

The form of the country's government was influenced by the American republic to the south. Noting the flaws perceived in the American system, the Fathers of Confederation opted to retain a monarchical form of government. Macdonald, speaking in 1865 about the proposals for the upcoming Confederation of Canada, said:

The form of government chosen is regarded as having created a federation that is a kingdom in its own right. Macdonald had spoken of "founding a great British monarchy" and wanted the newly created country to be called the "Kingdom of Canada". Although it had its monarch in London, the Colonial Office opposed as "premature" and "pretentious" the term "kingdom", as it was felt it might antagonize the United States. The term dominion was chosen to indicate Canada's status as a self-governing polity of the British Empire, the first time it was used in reference to a country.

While the BNA Act eventually resulted in Canada having more autonomy than it had before, it was far from full independence from the United Kingdom. According to the Supreme Court of Canada, Canadian "sovereignty was acquired in the period between its separate signature of the Treaty of Versailles in 1919 and the Statute of Westminster, 1931" long after Confederation in 1867. Defence of British North America became a Canadian responsibility. Foreign policy remained in British hands, the Judicial Committee of the Privy Council remained Canada's highest court of appeal, and the constitution could be amended only in Britain. Gradually, Canada gained more autonomy, and in 1931, obtained almost full autonomy within the British Commonwealth with the Statute of Westminster. Because the federal and provincial governments were unable to agree on a constitutional amending formula, this power remained with the British Parliament. In 1982, the constitution was patriated when Elizabeth II gave her royal assent to the Canada Act 1982. The Constitution of Canada is made up of a number of codified acts and uncodified traditions; one of the principal documents is the Constitution Act, 1982, which renamed the BNA Act 1867 to Constitution Act, 1867.

The act also detailed how power would be distributed at both the provincial and federal levels. Two of the most important sections were 91 and 92. Section 91 gave Parliament jurisdiction over banking, interest rates, criminal law, the postal system, and the armed forces. Section 92 gave the provinces jurisdiction over property, contracts and torts, local works, and general business. However, sometimes Parliament and Provincial law may interfere with each other, in this case federal law would prevail.

Results

Dominion elections were held in August and September to elect the first Parliament, and the four new provinces' governments recommended the 72 individuals (24 each for Quebec and Ontario, 12 each for New Brunswick and Nova Scotia) who would sit in the Senate.

The Anti-Confederation Party won 18 out of 19 federal Nova Scotia seats in September 1867, and in the Nova Scotia provincial election of 1868, 36 out of 38 seats in the legislature. For seven years, William Annand and Joseph Howe led the ultimately unsuccessful fight to convince British imperial authorities to release Nova Scotia from Confederation. The government was vocally against Confederation, contending it was no more than the annexation of the province to the pre-existing province of Canada.

Prior to the coming into effect of the Constitution Act, 1867 there had been some concern regarding a potential "legislative vacuum" that would occur over the 15-month period between the prorogation of the Province of Canada's final Parliament in August 1866 and the opening of the now Dominion of Canada's first Parliament in November 1867. To prevent this, the Constitution Act, 1867 provided for "continuance of existing laws" from the three colonies of Canada, Nova Scotia, and New Brunswick until new laws could be established in the Dominion. Thus, the "Dominion's financial systems, structures and actors were able to operate under the provisions of the old Province of Canada Acts" following confederation, and many institutions and organizations were continued and assumed "the same responsibilities for the new federal government that it had held as a provincial organization".

Fathers of Confederation

The original Fathers of Confederation are those delegates who attended any of the conferences held at Charlottetown and Quebec in 1864, or in London, United Kingdom, in 1866, leading to Confederation.

There were 36 original Fathers of Confederation. Hewitt Bernard, who was the recording secretary at the Charlottetown Conference, is considered by some to be a Father of Confederation. The later "Fathers" who brought the other provinces into Confederation after 1867 are also referred to as "Fathers of Confederation". In this way, Amor De Cosmos who was instrumental both in bringing democracy to British Columbia and in bringing his province into Confederation, is considered by many to be a Father of Confederation. As well, Joey Smallwood referred to himself as "the Last Father of Confederation", because he helped lead Newfoundland into Confederation in 1949.

Joining Confederation

After the initial BNA Act in 1867, Manitoba was established by an act of the Canadian Parliament on July 15, 1870, originally as an area of land much smaller than the current province. British Columbia joined Canada July 20, 1871, by an Imperial order-in-council enacted under the authority of the British North America Act. The order-in-council incorporated the Terms of Union negotiated by the governments of Canada and British Columbia, including a commitment by the federal government to build a railway connecting British Columbia to the railway system of Canada within 10 years of union. Prince Edward Island (PEI) joined July 1, 1873, also by an Imperial order-in-council. One reason for joining was financial: PEI's economy was performing poorly and union would bring monetary benefits that would assist the province in avoiding bankruptcy. One of the Prince Edward Island Terms of Union was a guarantee by the federal government to operate a ferry link, a term deleted upon completion of the Confederation Bridge in 1997. Alberta and Saskatchewan were established September 1, 1905, by acts of the Canadian Parliament. Newfoundland joined on March 31, 1949, by an act of the Imperial Parliament, also with a ferry link guaranteed.

The Crown acquired Rupert's Land and the North-Western Territory from the Hudson's Bay Company in 1869 (though final payment to the Hudson's Bay Company did not occur until 1870), and then transferred jurisdiction to the Dominion on July 15, 1870, merging them and naming them North-West Territories. In 1880, the British assigned all North American Arctic islands to Canada, right up to Ellesmere Island. From this vast swath of territory were created three provinces (Manitoba, Saskatchewan, Alberta) and two territories (Yukon Territory and North-West Territories, now Yukon and Northwest Territories), and two extensions each to Quebec, Ontario, and Manitoba. Later, the third territory of Nunavut was carved from the Northwest Territories on April 1, 1999. The Yukon territory was formed during the Klondike gold rush. People from all around Canada and the United States flocked to the area due to rumours of an easy way to get rich. The Canadian government sought to regulate this migration and tax gold findings, whether American or Canadian.

Below is a list of Canadian provinces and territories in the order in which they entered Confederation; territories are italicized. At formal events, representatives of the provinces and territories take precedence according to this ordering, except that provinces always precede territories. For provinces that entered on the same date, the order of precedence is based on the provinces' populations at the time they entered Confederation.

Legacy
The term Confederation has entered into Canadian parlance both as a metaphor for the country and for the historical events that created it. It has therefore become one of the most common names for Canadian landmarks. Examples include Mount Confederation, Confederation Square, Confederation Building, Confederation Park, Confederation Station, Confederation Heights, Confederation Bridge, and so on. This is similar to the American practices of naming things "Union" and likewise the Australians with "Federation".

Indigenous communities were absent or ignored in the process of Canadian confederation. As a result of Confederation, the Government of Canada assumed the responsibility of the British Crown in treaty dealings with the First Nations. One result of this was the Indian Act of 1873, which has governed relations ever since. Canada was no longer a colony of the United Kingdom, but Canadian Confederation continued the conditions of colonialismincluding resource grabbing, broken treaties, forced assimilation, culture loss, ecological destruction, heteropatriarchy, and intergenerational trauma inflicted by the hegemony of the Canadian stateon Indigenous nations that had been self-governing.

As the 20th century progressed, attention to the conditions of Indigenous peoples in Canada increased, which included the granting of full voting rights.  Prior to 1960, Status Indians were generally not eligible to vote in federal elections unless they gave up their status under the Indian Act. The Diefenbaker government amended the Canada Elections Act to remove those restrictions and recognise full voting rights for Status Indians in federal elections, effective July 1, 1960. Treaty rights were enshrined in the Canadian Constitution in 1982.  Recognizing the principle of aboriginal title, a process of land claims settlements is ongoing to settle un-extinguished aboriginal title between the federal government and various bands. Created to resolve the effects and after-effects of the residential school system, a Truth and Reconciliation Commission was struck to identify further measures to improve conditions.

Confederation timeline

See also

 150th anniversary of Canada
 History of Canada
 Territorial evolution of Canada
 List of documents from the constitutional history of Canada

Notes

References

Bibliography

 
 
 
 <
 
 
 
 
 
 Constitution Act, 1867
 
 .

Further reading

 Careless, J.M.C. "George Brown and Confederation," Manitoba Historical Society Transactions, Series 3, Number 26, 1969–70 online
 Creighton, Donald Grant. The road to confederation: The emergence of Canada, 1863–1867 (1965)  a standard history
 Creighton, Donald Grant. The young politician. Vol. 1 (1952) vol 1 of biography of Macdonald
 Gwyn, Richard. John A: The Man Who Made Us (2008) vol 1 of biography of Macdonald
Knox, Bruce A. "Conservative Imperialism 1858–1874: Bulwer Lytton, Lord Carnarvon, and Canadian Confederation." International History Review (1984) 6#3 pp: 333–357.
 Martin, Ged. Britain and the origins of Canadian confederation, 1837–67 (UBC Press, 1995). 
 Martin, Ged, ed. The Causes of Canadian confederation (Acadiensis Press, 1990). 
 Moore, Christopher. 1867: How the Fathers Made a Deal (McClelland & Stewart, 2011)
 Morton, William Lewis. The critical years: the union of British North America, 1857–1873 (McClelland & Stewart, 1964) a standard history
 Smith, Andrew.  British Businessmen and Canadian Confederation Constitution-Making in an Era of Anglo-Globalization (McGill-Queen's University Press, 2008)
 Smith, Andrew. "Toryism, Classical Liberalism, and Capitalism: The Politics of Taxation and the Struggle for Canadian Confederation." Canadian Historical Review 89#1 (2008): 1–25.
 Smith, Jennifer. "Canadian confederation and the influence of American federalism." Canadian Journal of Political Science 21#3 (1988): 443–464.
 Smith, Peter J. "The Ideological Origins of Canadian Confederation". Canadian Journal of Political Science 1987. 20#1 pp : 3–29.
 Vronsky, Peter. Ridgeway: The American Fenian Invasion and the 1866 Battle That Made Canada (Penguin Canada, 2011)
 Waite, Peter B. The life and times of Confederation, 1864–1867: politics, newspapers, and the union of British North America (Robin Brass Studio, 2001). 
 White, Walter Leroy, and W. C. Soderlund. Canadian Confederation: A Decision-making Analysis (McGill-Queen's Press-MQUP, 1979)
 Wilson, David A. Thomas D'Arcy McGee: The Extreme Moderate, 1857–1868. Vol. 2 (McGill-Queen's Press-MQUP, 2011)

Provinces and regions
 Bailey, Alfred G. "The basis and persistence of opposition to confederation in New Brunswick." Canadian Historical Review 23#4 (1942): 374–397.
 Bailey, Alfred G. "Railways and the Confederation Issue in New Brunswick, 1863–1865."  Canadian Historical Review 21#4 (1940): 367–383.
 Bolger, Francis. "Prince Edward Island and Confederation"  CCHA, Report, 28 (1961) pp: 25–30 online
 Bonenfant, Jean-Charles. The French Canadians and the birth of Confederation (Canadian Historical Association, 1966)
 Buckner, Phillip. "CHR Dialogue: The Maritimes and Confederation: A Reassessment." Canadian Historical Review 71#1 (1990) pp: 1–45.
 Hiller, James. Confederation Defeated: The Newfoundland Election of 1869 (Newfoundland Historical Society, 1976)
 Pryke, Kenneth G. Nova Scotia and Confederation, 1864–74 (1979)
 Shelton, W. George, ed. British Columbia and Confederation (1967)
 Silver, Arthur I. The French-Canadian idea of confederation, 1864–1900 (University of Toronto Press, 1997)
 Wilson, George E. "New Brunswick's entrance into confederation." Canadian Historical Review 9#1 (1928): 4–24.

Primary sources
 Waite, Peter B., ed. The Confederation Debates in the Province of Canada, 1865 A Selection (McGill-Queen's University Press, 2006)
 Quebec and London Conferences. Report of resolutions adopted at a conference of delegates from the provinces of Canada, Nova Scotia, and New Brunswick, and the colonies of Newfoundland and Prince Edward Island ..., London: s.n., 1867? [Resolutions of the Quebec Conference of October 10, 1864, and those of the London Conference of December 4, 1866, side by side]

External links

Library and Archives Canada.gov: Canadian Confederation collection 
Canadiana: "On the Road to Confederation" 
McCord Museum: "Confederation: The Creation of Canada"
Dictionary of Canadian Biography, "The Charlottetown and Quebec Conferences of 1864"

 
1840s in Canada
1850s in Canada
1860s in Canada
1867 in Canada
Federalism in Canada
National unifications
Political history of Canada
British North America
Pre-Confederation Canada
Post-Confederation Canada (1867–1914)

1867 in Canadian law
1867 in politics
19th century in Canada